In Canada, judicial review is the process that allows courts to supervise administrative tribunals' exercise of their statutory powers. Judicial review of administrative action is only available for decisions made by a governmental or quasi-governmental authority. The process allows individuals to challenge state actions, and ensures that decisions made by administrative tribunals follow the rule of law. The practice is meant to ensure that powers delegated by government to boards and tribunals are not abused, and offers legal recourse when that power is misused, or the law is misapplied. Judicial review is meant to be a last resort for those seeking to redress a decision of an administrative decision maker.

History 

Judicial review in Canada has its roots in the English common law system, where there are two sources of judicial review: the prerogative writs of certiorari and mandamus, and actions for damages. The British colonies that now form Canada were subject to administrative law from their very beginnings. Legal mechanisms were put into place to ensure that legislation created in the colonies was compliant with British law. The colonial legislatures had limited power, and the statutes that created them contained clauses which prevented them from passing laws that were non-compliant with British law. Judicial review of statutes passed in the colonies were carried out by the Judicial Committee of the Privy Council. This committee was created and obtained the power of judicial review through the Privy Council Acts of 1833 and 1844. The ability to review the statutes of the colonies meant that the Judicial Committee of the Privy Council became the highest appellate court for the colonies. The precedent of judicial review was set by the Judicial Committee, and subsequently, the Constitution Act of 1867 was drafted with a provision allowing for the courts to enforce limitations of legislative powers through judicial review.

Section 101 of The Constitution Act contains the clause that gives Parliament the power to create a "General Court of Appeal for the Federated Provinces." There is much debate amongst scholars whether or not this clause was initially meant to replace the Judicial Committee. Despite the intentions of the drafters of the constitution, section 101 was used to create first the Supreme and Exchequer Courts, both of which were explicitly formed, in part, to replace the Judicial Committee. In 1971, the Federal Court (composed of two divisions, the Federal Court of Appeal and the Federal Court, Trial Division) replaced the Exchequer Court of Canada. In 2003, the Federal Court was split into two separate courts, the Federal Court of Appeal and the Federal Court. The federal courts have jurisdiction over judicial review with respect to decisions of federal administrative tribunals and other matters of federal jurisdiction.

A major change to the mechanism of judicial review was the adoption of the Canadian Charter of Rights and Freedoms in 1982. This firmly entrenched the mechanism of judicial review with the superior courts. Today, administrative tribunals are subject to the written constitutional guarantees, and superior courts, while performing judicial review, look to these issues in addition to performing statutory interpretation and applying common law precedents.

Basic principles

Judicial discretion 
Courts may exercise their discretion and decide not to hear an application for judicial review. In order for the court to proceed with an application for judicial review, the issue being appealed must be public in nature. The scope of what is public is broad, and the decisions of private, or semi-private entities are sometimes determined to be sufficiently public as to undergo judicial review. Throughout the 20th century, what was considered public grew at a rapid pace. In the 1990s the scope shrunk slightly, but the previous growth significantly outweighed the change.

The court needs to believe that the party making the claim has standing, and that it has jurisdiction to hear the application. As well, the court analyzes whether the application was made within an appropriate amount of time, and whether the parties have exhausted all avenues of recourse. Other options that should be considered before judicial review include grievances and appeals. An application for judicial review does not automatically stop the administrative proceedings. In order to halt the proceedings, if they are ongoing, the applicant must also apply for a stay of proceedings.

Grounds 
The grounds for judicial review are broad, but not without limits. The court must be satisfied that there has been a jurisdictional error, an error of procedural fairness, or an error of fact. These grounds are laid out in s. 18.1(4) of the Federal Courts Act. This section of the Act also transfers authority over judicial review against any federal body from the provincial superior courts to the federal courts.

Judicial review for jurisdictional errors can occur where a decision is ultra vires, made in bad faith, making procedural errors, or making an error of law. Scholars disagree if procedural unfairness should be considered a separate ground, apart from jurisdiction. It is argued in Alberta v. Alberta (Labour Relations Board) that a breach of the duty to be fair is a ground that is separate, but akin to jurisdictional grounds. Contrarily, it has been argued that although the grounds for judicial review are procedural, the issue still goes to jurisdiction, which allows the superior courts to review the decision. Regardless, where there has been an instance of procedural unfairness, the courts will review the decision.

Where a privative clause exists, the courts hold that they do not insulate a decision from being reviewed on jurisdictional grounds. When the decision maker is acting within their jurisdiction, a privative clause will prevent judicial review even if there is an error of law.

Standard of review 

The standard of review is the degree of intensity that the courts use on an application for judicial review. Courts have always shown varying degrees of deference to administrative decision makers, and determining the level of deference is now considered its own step. Standard of review exists in two separate forms: correctness, and reasonableness. A third standard, reasonableness simpliciter, was once used but was abolished by the court in Dunsmuir v New Brunswick. The Supreme Court of Canada has indicated that every judicial review must begin with the addressing of standard of review. The principal factors once considered by the court when deciding the appropriate standard of review were: 
 whether there is a privative clause or right of appeal 
 the expertise of the administrative decision maker in the matter being decided
 the purpose of the enabling statute, and the specific provision that is being reviewed
 the nature of the problem being decided – is it a question of fact, law, or mixed fact and law?

The framework for judicial review was revised in Canada (Minister of Citizenship and Immigration) v Vavilov,<ref name="Vavilov">Canada (Minister of Citizenship and Immigration) v. Vavilov 2019 SCC 65</ref> where all decisions are now presumed to be held to a standard of reasonableness. This presumption can be rebutted in two ways:
1. through clear legislative intent; or,
2. if the rule of law requires that the standard of correctness be applied. 

The rule of law can require that the standard of correctness be applied in regards to constitutional questions, general questions of law of central importance to the whole legal system, and questions regarding jurisdictional boundaries between administrative bodies.

 Reasonableness 
A review of reasonableness reflects the principle of judicial restraint but at the same time, remains a robust form of judicial review. When conducting a review of reasonableness, the court examines an administrative decision for its transparency, intelligibility and justification, and looks at whether the decision falls within a range of acceptable outcomes that are defensible in respect of the facts and the law. Reasonableness itself is not a spectrum, but a single standard that is informed by the context of the issue being decided. Cases that use a standard of reasonableness are: 
 Canada (Citizenship and Immigration) v Khosa
 Catalyst Paper Corp v North Cowichan (District) 2012 SCC 2

 Correctness 
The correctness standard is applied when the courts give little deference to the administrative decision maker, and decide to review the decision in its entirety. When applying the correctness standard, the court carries out its own statutory analysis and arrive at its own understanding of how the issue should be decided. Some cases where the court uses a standard of correctness are: 
 Pushpanathan v Canada (Minister of Citizenship and Immigration) Northrop Grumman Overseas Services Corp v Canada (Attorney General) 2009 SCC 50, [2009] 3 SCR 309
 Stewart v Workplace Health, Safety and Compensation Commission, 2008 NBCA 45

 Remedies 
The remedies available to the courts when they are performing judicial review are all forms of injunction that originated with the early English prerogative writs. While monetary damages are common in private law, they are not a typical remedy of judicial review. None of the prerogative remedies are available to use against the Crown. Immunity from prerogative remedies is accorded to the Queen, the Lieutenant Governor, and cabinet ministers and public servants when they are exercising a power conferred by statute. The types of remedies available with judicial review are overlapping, and the court hearing the judicial review may decline to grant a remedy. The following are the remedies available for judicial review: 
 Certiorari is the method by which an administrative decision is brought before the court. It is also a remedy that the court can order, which sends the administrative decision back to the tribunal that decided it. Certiorari is often used when tribunals have acted without jurisdiction, or have make a jurisdictional error. This remedy is not used for preliminary decisions, but for final decisions. Certiorari is not a remedy used in private law, and is exclusively an administrative remedy.
 Mandamus is used to force a decision maker to follow its statutory duty. Section 28 of the Federal Courts Act gives the authority to grant mandamus over specific federal delegates to the Federal Court of Appeal.
 Prohibition: this remedy prevents the tribunal from deciding a matter that it does not have jurisdiction over. Because prohibition is designed to prevent the administrative body from deciding the issue, it is used at the beginnings of the proceedings. Like certiorari, prohibition is only used within public law.
 Habeas Corpus is a writ that challenges the detention of citizens by the state. Habeas corpus is generally use in administrative law for issues in immigration matters, prison law, and the detention of minors.
 Quo Warranto challenges the authority used to make a decision. This remedy is not frequently applied, as the courts generally prefer to find an equivalent statutory alternative.

 Limits 
Judicial review and its corresponding prerogative remedies are all discretionary. The court's discretion allows it to deny remedies, even when the applicant has made out their case. The following are common law reasons that the court may refuse relief.
 Mootness: Where remedies would be futile, or incapable of meaningfully being implemented, the court will not enforce them. Similarly, where the court finds an error in the initial decision, but the remedy sought would not change the outcome, the remedy may be withheld.
 Delay: The court may refuse relief where the applicant has caused an unreasonable delay in bringing its application. Whether there has been delay is determined on a case-by-case basis.
 Waiver: Where a decision is made by a body that does not have jurisdiction, the court may still deny relief based on the applicants conduct. This does not mean that the decision is validated, it does mean that the applicant's conduct weighed heavily enough that the court decided to withhold a remedy. Waiver may also occur when an applicant fails to object to procedural unfairness and continued to participate in the proceedings.
 Availability of Alternative Remedies: Where an equally effective alternative remedy exists at the statutory level, the courts may decide to exercise their discretion to refuse a remedy. This occurred in Harelkin v University of Regina, where the Supreme Court of Canada determined that precedence should be given to statutory remedies. The Court is reticent to point to other forms of relief when the remedy sought is habeas corpus. 
 Conduct of the Applicant: Like waiver and delay, the court may refuse to offer relief because of the applicant's conduct. Relief may be denied because of bad faith dealings, deceitfulness, or fraudulent conduct. Where the court finds that the applicant's conduct is improper, they will refuse relief.
In addition to this list, the court may also use its discretion to refuse remedies based on specific statutory grounds.

 Legislation 
The jurisdiction of the application for judicial review determines which governing legislation will be used. The Federal Court has exclusive jurisdiction over relief against federal boards, commissions, or other tribunals. The superior courts in each province have exclusive jurisdiction for judicial review of decisions of provincial administrative agencies.

 The Federal Courts Act 
The Federal Courts Act, and the concurrent Federal Courts Rules govern any application for judicial review in the federal courts. The source of this power can be found in s. 28 of the Federal Courts Act, which provides that the Federal Court of Appeal is the appropriate venue for judicial review of decisions by federal boards and tribunals. In the federal courts, there is a specific 30 day time limitation with which to make an application for judicial review, which can be found in s.18.1(2).

 British Columbia's Judicial Review Procedure Act and Administrative Tribunals Act  
This British Columbia legislation governs the superior courts judicial review of administrative tribunals' decisions. The Act only has twenty-one sections, but each contains important provisions for applications for judicial review in British Columbia. When considering the Act, it is important to remember that other legislation impacts it, such as the Administrative Tribunal Act, which creates a 60 day time limit for judicial review. This directly affects s. 11 of the Act, and the court in Braut v Johnson determined that the 60 day limitation period governs, where the applicant has not shown that they have: 1) serious grounds for relief; 2) a reasonable explanation for the delay in application; and, 3) no substantial prejudice or hardship will result to a person affected by the delay.

Other important sections include section 1, which defines the terms and parties included in judicial review, and states that all relevant judicial review must take place in the Supreme Court of British Columbia. Section 5 allows the court to send back any part of the decision for reconsideration, whether it be the whole or the part. Section 18 abolishes the quo warranto remedy, and section 12 addresses the writs of mandamus, prohibition, and certiorari, which are not issued.

 Ontario Judicial Review Procedure Act 
In Ontario, the JRPA'' governs the mechanism of judicial review.

Criticisms 
Judicial review of administrative actions is a controversial part of Canadian law. Proponents of judicial review argue that it is a mechanism that forces governments to act within their statutory limits. Another common justification for judicial review is  that administrative tribunals perform functions similar to the courts, and should therefore be subject to the same procedural safeguards.

Critics of judicial review argue that allowing the judiciary to review decisions, and ultimately change outcomes, of decisions made by elected representatives is undemocratic. A second issue regarding judicial review that is frequently criticized is the administrative law's inability to adapt quickly. This is particularly prevalent when considering the increase of private contracting taking place in public institutions. Scholars have stated that if the administrative law does not adapt to this change, then courts' abilities to judicially review the decisions of administrative bodies will not be as strong.

See also 
 Canadian administrative law

References

External links
What to Consider Before Seeking Judicial Review at the Federal Court
The Canadian Judicial System
Apply to the Federal Court of Canada for Judicial Review
How to File an Application for Judicial Review
Judicial Review Procedure Act | British Columbia
Federal Courts Act
Federal Courts Rules 
An Applicant's Guide to Judicial Review
Administrative Fairness Guidelines | Alberta Ombudsman
Judicial Review Procedure Act | Ontario

Law of Canada
Canada